Brookula strebeli is a species of sea snail, a marine gastropod mollusk unassigned in the superfamily Seguenzioidea.

Description
The maximum recorded size of the shell is 1.54 mm.

Distribution
This species occurs in subantarctic waters off the South Georgia Islands.

References

 Dell, R. K. 1990. Antarctic Mollusca, with special reference to the fauna of the Ross Sea. Royal Society of New Zealand Bulletin 27: iv + 311 pp.
 Zelaya D.G., Absalão R.S. & Pimenta A.D. 2006. A revision of Benthobrookula Clarker, 1961 (Gastropoda, Trochoidea) in the Southwestern Atlantic Ocean. Journal of Molluscan Studies, 72(1): 77–87
 Engl W. (2012) Shells of Antarctica. Hackenheim: Conchbooks. 402 pp.

strebeli
Gastropods described in 1951